Rob Allyn (born October 18, 1959) is an American film producer, screenwriter, media company owner and New York Times best-selling author. He is chairman and CEO of Margate House Films, based at Fox Studios in Sydney. Working with his son, director-screenwriter Conor Allyn, he co-wrote and produced Red and White, Blood of Eagles and Hearts of Freedom, along with the documentary Hungry is the Tiger.

Early career 
Born in California on October 18, 1959, Allyn gained his bachelor's degree in government from Georgetown University in Washington, D.C., where he attended the School of Foreign Service. He holds a Master of Liberal Arts Degree from Southern Methodist University and began his career as a Capitol Hill aide, PepsiCo executive speechwriter to Texas Governor Bill Clements in the early 1980s.

In 2004, he was appointed to the board of directors of ACE Cash Express.

in year 2014, Rob Allyn was hired by Prabowo Subianto's campaign in 2014 Indonesian presidential election but Rob Allyn's involvement was denied by gerindra, Prabowo Subianto's political party.

Media industry 
In 1983, Rob Allyn founded Allyn & Company, an advertising, public relations and political media agency based in Dallas, Austin, Phoenix and Mexico City. In 2002, Allyn sold his agency to Omnicom and served for five more years as its CEO. During 25 years in the media industry, Allyn served as a political strategist to presidents, prime ministers, foreign governments and political parties.

Author, novelist and TV commentator 
In 2007, Rob Allyn wrote Revolution of Hope with former Mexican President Vicente Fox. Published in English and Spanish by Viking Press, the book made the New York Times Best-Sellers List.

Allyn was also a television commentator on Fox News and PBS. He has appeared on CNN's Inside Politics, The O'Reilly Factor, The MacNeil-Lehrer Report and Listening to America with Bill Moyers.

Film and entertainment industry 
In 2007, Rob Allyn founded Margate House Films in south east Asia. His first film, Red and White (2009) received strong reviews. and won Best Film, Best Director, Best Actress and First Place People's Choice Award at the Bali International Film Festival. The film led to two sequels, Blood of Eagles, and Heart of Freedom.

Allyn also created, wrote and produced the feature documentary Hungry is the Tiger which was selected for the Rome Film Festival Asiatica Film Mediale and nominated as Best Documentary at the 53rd Asia Pacific Film Festival in Taiwan and the 2010 Hot Springs Documentary Film Festival in the United States.

In 2012, Allyn co-wrote and produced Java Heat, a crime-thriller set in Indonesia about an American (played by Kellan Lutz) who teams up with a local cop (Ario Bayu) to track down an eccentric jewel-thief (played by Mickey Rourke). The film was released worldwide in mid-2013.

In 2019, Allyn began working on a biopic titled Rajah which tells the life of famed British-born adventurer  James Brooke who became the ruler of Sarawak. The film later titled Edge of the World is slated for an American-Malaysian joint release in June 2021.

References

External link 

 

Living people
Mass media people from California
Walsh School of Foreign Service alumni
Southern Methodist University alumni
1959 births
Writers from California
American chief executives